Eslöv Municipality (Eslövs kommun) is one of 290 municipalities of Sweden, situated in Skåne County in southern Sweden. Its seat is located in the city of Eslöv.

The present municipality was created in 1971, when the former City of Eslöv was amalgamated with a number of surrounding municipalities, most of them created by the earlier nationwide local government reform in 1952.

The municipality has several interesting places. There are 11 castles. Hjularöd's castle was the setting of the Swedish TV classic Mystery of Greveholm broadcast by SVT. In the Västra Strö village by the church there is an ancient monument consisting of five standing stones and two runestones DR 334 and DR 335 dating from about the year 1000. Sweden's only sugar refinery lies in Örtofta, south of Eslöv. In Eslöv there are two nature reserves, Allmänningen and Abullahagen. The Stone Mountain, Eslöv Church and Hotel Sten Stensson Sten with the locally famous "Scanish Steps" lie in the middle of Eslöv. Maybe the most famous inhabitant of Eslöv is the comedian Johan Glans, who has made several TV series and is well known throughout the country.

Localities
There are 13 urban areas in the municipality. As of 2015, they were:

Twin towns - Sister cities 
 Asker
 Rudersdal
 Garðabær
 Jakobstad
 Viljandi

Gallery

References
Statistics Sweden

External links

Eslöv Municipality Official site
Coat of arms

Municipalities of Skåne County